Matt Faddes (born 6 November 1991) is a New Zealand rugby union player who currently plays as a centre, wing or fullback for Otago.

Early career

Born in the town of Balclutha, located halfway between Dunedin and Invercargill on New Zealand's South Island, Faddes was educated at South Otago High School in his hometown.

Professional career

Faddes first played provincial rugby for Otago in 2011 ITM Cup, debuting against .

He only saw action once in 2014, but in 2015 his career in the 15-man game really began to take off.

Following the unfortunate defeat Faddes decided to try his hand at a different field, Accounting at the University of Otago.

Super Rugby

Excellent showings in the midfield for Otago during the 2015 ITM Cup saw Faddes earn a Super Rugby contract with the Dunedin-based  ahead of the 2016 season.

Tony Brown replaced the -bound Jamie Joseph as Highlanders head coach ahead of the 2017 season and having worked with Faddes at provincial level, he retained him in the squad for his first year in charge.

Move to Ulster

Faddes moved to Northern Ireland to join Ulster ahead of the 2019–20 season, and has played both in the Pro14 and European Rugby Champions Cup.

Faddes returned to Otago in 2021.

International

Faddes was an All Blacks Sevens representative in 2013, helping them to victory in the 2013 London Sevens and playing in 3 competitions in total throughout the season.

On 5 November 2016, Faddes featured in the number 14 jersey for the Barbarians in their 31-31 draw against  at Wembley Stadium.  He was replaced by Australian Luke Morahan in the 51st minute of the match.

Career honours

All Blacks Sevens

IRB Sevens World Series 2012–13

Super Rugby statistics

References

1991 births
Living people
Barbarian F.C. players
Expatriate rugby union players in Northern Ireland
Highlanders (rugby union) players
Male rugby sevens players
New Zealand expatriate rugby union players
New Zealand expatriate sportspeople in Northern Ireland
New Zealand international rugby sevens players
New Zealand rugby union players
North Otago rugby union players
Otago rugby union players
People educated at South Otago High School
Rugby union centres
Rugby union fullbacks
Rugby union players from Balclutha, New Zealand
Rugby union wings
Ulster Rugby players